The Athletics Competition at the 1983 Pan American Games was held at the Estadio Olímpico in Caracas, Venezuela, between 23 and 28 August.

Medal summary

Men's Events

Women's Events

Medal table

Participating nations

See also
 1983 in athletics (track and field)

References

 Pan American Games results at GBR Athletics

 
1983
Pan American Games
1983 Pan American Games
Events at the 1983 Pan American Games